Eftim Aksentiev (born 17 August 1985) is a footballer from the Republic of Macedonia that plays as a midfielder / striker for FK Osogovo

External links
 
 
 

1985 births
Living people
People from Kočani
Association football midfielders
Macedonian footballers
FK Sileks players
FK Rabotnički players
KF Skënderbeu Korçë players
KS Pogradeci players
FK Bregalnica Štip players
KF Gostivari players
FK Gorno Lisiče players
FK Osogovo players
FK Sasa players
Macedonian First Football League players
Macedonian Second Football League players
Kategoria Superiore players
Macedonian expatriate footballers
Macedonian expatriate sportspeople in Albania
Expatriate footballers in Albania